The Taichung Mosque is a mosque in Nantun District, Taichung, Taiwan. It is the fourth mosque to be built in Taiwan.

History
After fleeing Mainland China with the Nationalist Government at the end of Chinese Civil War in 1949, some Chinese Muslims resided in Tianzhong Township, Changhua County. To accommodate theirs needs to pray, Muslims did their prayers in some houses. One notable house used for prayer was the house of Qi Yulao (耆于老). When their number grew bigger, such venues could no longer accommodate all of them.

First building

Ever since, they started to plan to build a mosque in 1951 with funds raised from various sources, including the government of Saudi Arabia. They chose the Japanese-style house at the No. 12, Lane 165, Zhongxiao Road (忠孝路), South District as the location for the Taichung Mosque. The size of the mosque was 130 square meter. Following a visit by the Minister of Transport of Saudi Arabia in April 1975 who found the mosque to be in a complete disrepair, funds were provided to the Chinese Muslim Association to establish a new Taichung Mosque at a new site.

Current building
The construction of the new mosque building started in 1988. However, due to financial difficulties, the construction was temporarily halted until May 1989 before it proceeded again until its completion in August 1990. With additional buildings and hardware, the entire construction project of the mosque was completed in 1994 with a cost of US$54,000, which resulted the current mosque building used today at Dadun South Road (大燉南路).

On 29 September 2020, Chunghwa Post released stamps featuring Taichung Mosque and Taipei Grand Mosque with denomination of NT$28 and NT$15 respectively.

Activities
Five daily prayers are regularly held at the mosque, including the Eid prayers. The library of Taichung Mosque is used to host many activities to inform the general public about Islam.

In 1997, the mosque hired Shan Yaowu (閃耀武), a Chinese Muslim from Myanmar, as the imam of the mosque. He graduated from Al-Azhar University in Cairo, Egypt studying Islamic law. His duty was to conduct religious affairs and missionary activities. During his term, he vigorously promoted visionary works. He spent four years preaching over 50 Friday prayer sermons and then edited some of the sermons into books which were sent to each mosque throughout Taiwan.

In May 2003, the mosque hired Bao Xiaolin (保孝廉), a graduate from the Missionary Department of the Islamic University of Madinah in Saudi Arabia, as the vice president in charge of conducting religious affairs. He encouraged young Taiwanese Muslim to come to the mosque to study the Quran and Arabic during holidays and weekends. He worked tirelessly to improve Taichung Muslims' knowledge on Islamic culture.

Architecture

After the new board of mosque reelection in 1990, they made some expansion to the mosque, which includes a three-story building, Islamic shop, Islamic restaurant, suites and dormitories for imams, classrooms and Muslim cemetery.

Transportation
Taichung Mosque is accessible within walking distance southeast from Nantun Station of Taichung Metro.

See also
 Islam in Taiwan
 Chinese Muslim Association
 Chinese Muslim Youth League
 List of mosques in Taiwan

References

External links

 
 YouTube - Taichung Mosque Friday Prayer Sermon on 29 June 2014 

1951 establishments in Taiwan
Mosques in Taiwan
Mosques completed in 1990
Religious buildings and structures in Taichung
Relocated buildings and structures in Taiwan